The Fair Warning Tour was a concert tour by hard rock band Van Halen in support of their fourth studio album Fair Warning.

Background
The tour began with two to three night performances with the band being focused on performing only in North America. The June 11, 12 and 13 shows in Oakland were filmed, creating music videos for "Unchained", "So This is Love?" and "Hear About It Later", though Roth stated in an interview that the two nights of filming were a disaster and the footage from the third show had to be scrapped as a result. The band concluded their tour as an opening act for two shows with the Rolling Stones at Tangerine Bowl on October 24 and 25.

Reception
Don Adair from The Spokesman-Review gave the performance he attended in Spokane a positive review. He began his review, stating that Van Halen was music to be enjoyed on the most elemental levels, citing it as flashy, showy, brazen hormone rock and that it was pointless to pass judgement on Van Halen. He acknowledged the stage design, adding that there was follow-spots lighting the band from the rear of the stage with others from out front and around the drum stand - noting it as the drum kit lit up like an encounter from the third kind. He continued on the speakers hanging from the coliseum's ceiling and front wall of the building adjacent to the stage with amplifiers behind the band, comparing it to a mountain range in aluminum. He would criticize the acoustics though as it did muddle Eddie Van Halen's playing. He praised David Lee Roth as still having the moves and hitting home with unerring accuracy, but had criticized his voice as being only average, stating his trademark squeal should have been forgotten long ago. He concluded his review, stating that the sold out audience got what they paid for.

Jim Bruce from The Windsor Star who attended the Cobo Arena show in Detroit, opening his review, noting on how all three of the shows that had sold out had translated to 50,000 fans aged between 15 and 25, with tremendous amounts of emotion given when the band had arrived on stage to which he described their entrance as if they appeared in a blaze of flashing light, adding that he thought Armageddon had arrived. He praised all four of the members in the band, citing them as proven master musicians - also referring to Eddie Van Halen as exceptionally fine lead guitarist. He concluded his review, stating that the audience at the conclusion of the show left with smiles on their faces instead of chips on their shoulders.

Jennifer Towell from The Montreal Gazette opened her review, noting on how the band showed everything in agreement to a banner fans made which declared: "Disco Sucks". She added that the noise level wasn't no accident as the band had brought more than 100 speakers to produce the sound that in comparison, had outblasted any record banned on the regular family stereo. She praised Eddie and Alex's musical accompaniment, saying it was the perfect complement to Roth's "sexually immodest gyrations".

Setlist

Songs played overall
"On Fire"
"Sinner's Swing!"
Alex Van Halen drum solo
"Hear About It Later"
"So This Is Love?"
"Jamie's Cryin'"
Michael Anthony bass solo
"Runnin' with the Devil"
"Dance the Night Away"
"Sunday Afternoon in the Park" and "Romeo Delight"
"Summertime Blues" (Eddie Cochran cover)
"Everybody Wants Some!!"
"Ice Cream Man" (John Brim cover)
"Mean Street"
Eddie Van Halen guitar solo ["Eruption", "Spanish Fly", "Women in Love..." (Intro) and "Cathedral"]
"Lucille" (Little Richard cover)
"Feel Your Love Tonight"
"You Really Got Me" (The Kinks cover)
Encore
"Unchained"
"Growth" + "Ain't Talkin' 'Bout Love"

Typical set list
"On Fire"
"Sinner's Swing!"
"Alex Van Halen drum solo"
"Hear About It Later"
"So This Is Love?"
"Jamie's Cryin'"
Michael Anthony bass solo
"Runnin' with the Devil"
"Dance the Night Away"
"Sunday Afternoon in the Park" and "Romeo Delight"
"Everybody Wants Some!!"
"Ice Cream Man" (John Brim cover)
"Mean Street"
Eddie Van Halen guitar solo ["Eruption", "Spanish Fly", "Women in Love..." (Intro) and "Cathedral"]
"Feel Your Love Tonight"
"You Really Got Me" (The Kinks cover)
Encore
"Unchained"
"Growth" and "Ain't Talkin' 'Bout Love"

Tour dates

Box office score data

Personnel
 Eddie Van Halen – guitar, backing vocals, keyboards
 David Lee Roth – lead vocals, acoustic guitar
 Michael Anthony – bass, backing vocals, keyboards
 Alex Van Halen – drums

References

Citations

General sources

Van Halen concert tours
1981 concert tours